The A38 autoroute is a toll free motorway in Côte-d'Or, France. The road runs between the A6 autoroute at Pouilly-en-Auxois to Dijon.

Junctions

References

External links

Autoroute A38 dans Saratlas

A38